Piatra Neamț is the capital city of Neamț County, in the historical region of  Western Moldavia, in northeastern Romania. Because of its privileged location in the Eastern Carpathian mountains, it is considered one of the most picturesque cities in Romania. The Nord-Est Regional Development Agency is located in Piatra Neamț.

Etymology
The toponym piatra (meaning ‘rock’) was always part of the settlement's name throughout its history. It is also called Piatra lui  (‘Christmas Rock’, thus also corresponding to the Hungarian name of the city, "-"). It is also simply called Piatra, to which the county name Neamț (meaning ‘German’) was added.

Geography and access 
The river Doamna is a right tributary of the Bistrița; it flows into the Bâtca Doamnei Reservoir near Piatra Neamț.

Piatra Neamț is linked by Romanian railways trunk number 509 to Bacău (and from there by Line 500 to Bucharest), and by  national road to Bacău (and from there by DN2 to Bucharest), Iași, Suceava, and Târgu Mureș in the Transylvania region.

The city is informally divided in several districts (in Romanian: cartiere):
 1 Mai
 Băcioaia
 Centru
 Ciritei
 Dărmănești
 Doamna
 Gara Veche
 Mărăței
 Precista
 Sarata
 Speranța
 Valea Viei
 Văleni
 Vânători

Of these, Ciritei, Doamna, and Văleni are formally separate villages administered by the municipality. There are plans to build two new districts, the larger of which will be on the site of the former Reconstrucția factory.

History

The area around Piatra Neamț is one of the oldest inhabited areas in Romania. The oldest traces of human civilisation in the present territory date back to the higher Paleolithic, about 100,000 years BCE. The Cucuteni culture, whose development lasted approximately one thousand years ( 3600-2600 BCE) was attested in the territory of Neamţ county by a remarkable number of settlements (approx. 150), archaeological diggings unearthing important museum collections of Aeneolithic artifacts. Archaeologists have also discovered objects here dating back to the Neolithic Period and the Bronze Age (about 1900-1700 BCE).

Excavations just outside the city revealed the ruins of a large Dacian city, Petrodava, mentioned by Greek geographer Ptolemy in the 2nd century. The whole compound had its heyday between the first century BCE and the first century CE. Standing out is the citadel at Bâtca Doamnei which contains shrines resembling those identified in the Orăștie Mountains. As far as the existence of a local leader is concerned, historians tend to suggest the identification of the Kingdom of Dicomes in the very political centre at Petrodava. The complex of strongholds without peer in Moldavia and Wallachia is evidence as to a powerful political and military centre both in Burebista’s time and in the period that preceded the reign of Decebalus. The settlement was documented in the 15th century as Piatra lui Crăciun, or Camena, a market town.

The first urban settlements, which emerged under Petru I Mușat (1375–1391), were Piatra lui Crăciun, Roman, and Neamț. The Neamț citadel, whose documentary attestation dates back to February 2, 1395, was also erected during the same consolidation period of the Moldavian principality east of the Carpathians.

In 2020, ten people were killed in a hospital fire.

Demographics

According to the 2011 census data, Piatra Neamț has a population of 85,055, a decrease from the figure recorded at the 2002 census, making it the 24th largest city in Romania. The 2002 census recorded 104,914 people living within the city of Piatra Neamț. The ethnic makeup was as follows:

 Romanians: 98.08%
 Roma: 1.3%
 Lipovans: 0.16%
 Hungarians: 0.14%
 Other: 0.32%

Economy
The city's industries include a fertilizer plant, a pulp and paper mill, and several food-processing plants. In the city are also located an agricultural machinery plant (Mecanica Ceahlău), a pharmaceutical plant (Plantavorel) and two paper manufacturers.

During the communist period, the Săvinești platform was one of the most important chemical plants in Romania and the site of a research institute. Today, the industrial facility is part of the Italian company Radici Group, and it operates at low capacity.

In recent times, the most important Romanian commercial brands originating from Piatra Neamț are Rifil (synthetic fibers manufacturer), Altex (Media Galaxy) (TV, hi-fi, home appliances national dealer),  (paints manufacturer), Amicii-Kubo Ice Cream (ice cream producer) and Dasimpex (mobile phones dealer).

There are 4 local TV stations (TV M, 1TV, TeleM, Actual TV), 3 FM radio stations, and several newspapers, including online newspapers such as CityNeamț and Ziar Piatra Neamț.

Transport

Public transport

Public transport in Piatra Neamț is managed mainly by S.C. Troleibuzul SA. Until 2019, the company operated both trolleybuses and motorbuses. Although the company's name still includes a reference to trolleybuses, the last trolleybus service was discontinued in September 2019, the trolleybuses were put up for sale in March 2020, and removal of the overhead trolley wires began in June 2020. The trolleybus system had opened in 1995. The company now operates only motorbuses.

 There are seven urban bus lines between the city's districts and the suburban communes of Dumbrava Roșie and Săvinești.
 There are 18 bus lines which connect the suburbs with the city centre.
 More private companies operate minibuses (of types Mercedes-Benz Sprinter, Volkswagen Crafter, Iveco Daily, and Ford Transit).

Taxi transport
Several local companies operate taxi services inside the city.

Rail
The Piatra Neamț railway station is the main train station which serves Piatra Neamț. From there arrive and depart daily, 8 Regio trains on the route Piatra Neamț - Bacău and return, 4 Regio trains on the route Bicaz - Bacau and return, an Inter Regio train Piatra Neamț - Bucharest North (attachment to a train Suceava - Bucharest North in Bacău) and a train Regio Express Bicaz - Bucharest North (attached to a train Suceava - Bucharest North in Bacău).

Road
Piatra Neamț is a road junction. There, DN15 intersects with DN15C and DN15D. Also, the city is served by three bus stations, where intercity bus services between the city and other major Romanian cities start and terminate.

Culture and education
Piatra Neamț is home to Teatrul Tineretului (Youth's Theatre), the G. T. Kirileanu Library, and many cultural events, including the International Theatre Festival in the springtime, the classical music event  (musical holidays) in the summertime and more folkloric festivals all year round.

The Petru Rareș National College, "Calistrat Hogaș" national college, National College of Computer Science as well as "Victor Brauner" Fine Arts College are some of the most prestigious education centres in the Neamt county.

Starting with January 2009, Piatra Neamț is the host of a short film festival called "Filmul de Piatra" (derived from the name of the city "Piatra" which means stone (rock) and translated as "Stone-film Festival"). The 1st edition took place in the building of Teatrul Tineretului and other locations between 7th and 11 January 2009. The festival has a national short film competition (all genres) and awards each category. The agenda also includes selections of international shorts, awarded in major festivals throughout the world. Other special programmes include live concerts, skiing and workshops.

Attractions

The city's main attractions are the natural environment of the area (the mountains and the lakes), the historical buildings, the museums, and the festivals. There are several projects in progress with the goal of transforming Piatra Neamț into a tourist destination in Romania; those projects include  construction of a cable car and winter sports facilities. As of March 2022 there is a cable car service running from the railway station to the top of Cozla mountain.

Landmarks

 St John the Baptist church (1497–1498) and Stephen's tower (1499), during Stephen the Great's reign
 The Princely Court
 The History & Archaeology Museum (host of the Cucuteni exhibition, the largest Aeneolithic artifacts collection in southeastern Europe)
 The Fine Arts Museum
 The Natural Sciences Museum
 The "Calistrat Hogaș" Memorial Museum
 The "Schimbarea la Față" Wooden Church in Văleni
 The Wooden Synagogue

Parks
 Central Park
 Cozla Park (including the Zoo and Cozla ski run)
 Ștrandul Tineretului (including the Equestrian Stadium)

Sports 

FC Ceahlăul Piatra Neamț is the local football (soccer) team; its best performance was third round in UEFA Intertoto Cup in 1999, after two matches versus Juventus Torino.

Former Fibrex Săvinești, actually HCM Piatra Neamț is the local men's handball team, three times champions of Romania and two times winners of Handball Romania's Cup. VC Unic Piatra Neamț is the local women's volleyball team.

Piatra Neamț is the residence of Constantin "Ticu" Lăcătușu, the first Romanian alpinist who reached the top of Mount Everest.

The Piatra Neamț Equestrian Stadium (Baza Hipică) is the host of several show jumping and dressage international competitions.

Natives

 Marcel Adams, real estate investor
 Gershon Benjamin, painter
 Coca Bloos, actress
 Anda-Louise Bogza, soprano singer
 Harry Brauner, ethnomusicologist
 Victor Brauner, painter 
 Emil Calmanovici, industrialist and communist activist
 Ramona Cheorleu, television presenter and model
 Alexandru Dabija, stage director and actor
 Sergiu Dan, novelist and journalist
 Luminița Dinu-Huțupan, handball player
 Dan Graur, evolutionary biologist
 Carola Grindea, pianist and teacher
 Jacques Hérold, painter
 Constantin Lăcătușu, mountain climber (first Romanian ascent on Mount Everest) 
 Gheorghe Manoliu, general
 Alexandru Maxim, football player
 Mihaela Rădulescu, TV host
 Andrei Rohețki, football player
 Teodora Sava, singer and actress
 Leon Sculy Logothetides, surgeon and politician
 Henric Streitman, journalist and politician
 Gheorghe Tadici, handball coach
 Bogdan Țăruș, athlete
 Daniel Tătaru, mathematician
 Jan Tausinger, violist, conductor, and composer
 Mihai Trăistariu, singer and songwriter
 V. A. Urechia, historian and writer
 Laura Vasiliu, actress
 Lascăr Vorel, painter
 A. L. Zissu, writer and journalist

Twin towns – sister cities

Piatra Neamț is twinned with:

 Alpharetta, United States
 Beinasco, Italy
 Bergama, Turkey
 Edineț, Moldova
 Hlyboka, Ukraine
 Kiryat Malakhi, Israel
 Lod, Israel
 Mably, France
 Manilva, Spain
 Orhei, Moldova
 Riorges, France
 Roanne, France
 Verbania, Italy
 Villerest, France

In popular culture

Astronomical dedication
In 1998 an asteroid was named after Piatra Neamț by Alfredo Caronia, an Italian amateur astronomer and co-discoverer of the asteroid, who lives in the city.

Gallery

References

External links

 Piatra Neamț news
 Neamt County Museum Complex
 piatraneamt.webs.com
 20,000-year-old stone pendant found in Piatra Neamț
 Piatra Neamț City Hall
 Vizitează Piatra Neamț 
 Neamț online 

 
Cities in Romania
Capitals of Romanian counties
Populated places in Neamț County
Localities in Western Moldavia